Momich Lakes Provincial Park is a provincial park in British Columbia, Canada, located at the north end of Adams Lake 100 km northeast of Kamloops.

References
BC Parks webpage

External links

Provincial parks of British Columbia
Parks in the Shuswap Country
1996 establishments in British Columbia
Protected areas established in 1996